David McKittrick (born 1949) is a Belfast-born journalist who has reported on Northern Ireland since 1971.

Professional career
McKittrick began his career as a reporter for the East Antrim Times. He joined the Irish Times in 1973 as a reporter in Belfast, becoming Northern editor in 1976 and London editor in 1981. He worked briefly for BBC Northern Ireland between 1985 and 1986, before joining The Independent. He has since worked as the paper's Irish correspondent.

Widely recognised for the scope of his knowledge and the balance of his reporting on Northern Ireland, he contributes regularly to overseas newspapers and journals. His many awards include the Christopher Ewart-Biggs Memorial Prize for the promotion of peace and understanding in Northern Ireland, 1989 and 2001; Correspondent of the Year, 1999; and the 2000 Orwell Prize for Journalism.

His book Lost Lives was made into a 2019 documentary by Michael Hewitt and Diarmuid Lavery.

Selected works
"Endgame in Ireland" (1994),
"The Fight for Peace" (with Éamon Mallie, 1994),
"Lost Lives" (with Séamus Kelters, Brian Feeney and Chris Thornton, 1999),
"Making Sense of the Troubles" (with David McVea, 2000).

See also

 History of Northern Ireland
 List of Northern Irish writers
 The Irish Times
 The Independent

References

Living people
1949 births
Journalists from Belfast
Christopher Ewart-Biggs Memorial Prize recipients
Male non-fiction writers from Northern Ireland